This is a list of now defunct airlines from Liberia.

See also

 List of airlines of Liberia
 List of airports in Liberia

References

Liberia
Airlines
Airlines, defunct